The Ambassador is a novel by Australian author Morris West. It was first published in 1965. The novel is fictionalisation of the period leading up to and shortly after the Coup d'état against and assassination of South Vietnamese President Ngo Dinh Diem.

References

1965 Australian novels
Novels set in Vietnam
Fiction set in 1963
Novels set during the Cold War
Works by Morris West